A "ferry house" (sometimes spelled "ferryhouse") is an old word referring to a ferry station, typically including a residence for the ferry operators. Ferry House may refer to:

 Ferryhouse, a former industrial school known formally as St Joseph’s Industrial School, in County Tipperary, Ireland

in Canada
 The Bennett Ferry House, the oldest remaining structure in Gores Landing, Ontario.

in England
 The Eccleston Ferry House, a farmhouse to the southeast of the village of Eccleston, Cheshire, England.
 The Ferry House Inn, a pub in the village of Surlingham, South Norfolk, England.

in the United States (by state)
 The Ferry House at 162-2 Ferry Road in the Hadlyme Ferry Historic District, Connecticut
 The Nishnabotna Ferry House, Lewis, Iowa, listed on the NRHP in Cass County, Iowa
 Young's Ferry House, Bowling Green, Kentucky, listed on the NRHP in Warren County, Kentucky
 Bowlingly, a historic home also known as "The Ferry House" located at Queenstown, Queen Anne's County, Maryland
Edward P. Ferry House, Grand Haven, Michigan, listed on the NRHP in Ottawa County, Michigan
 Johnson Ferry House, Washington Crossing State Park, New Jersey, listed on the NRHP in Mercer County, New Jersey
 The Swatara Ferry House, Middletown, Pennsylvania, listed on the NRHP in Dauphin County, Pennsylvania
 Hawley's Ferry House, Ferrisburg, Vermont, listed on the NRHP in Addison County, Vermont
Ferry Plantation House, Virginia Beach, Virginia, listed on the NRHP in Virginia Beach, Virginia
 The Ferry House (Ebey's Landing), a vernacular Inn near Coupeville, Washington, in Ebey's Landing National Historical Reserve
 Pierre P. Ferry House, Seattle, Washington, listed on the NRHP within King County, Washington.